Patti Kim may refer to:
 Patti Kim (singer), South Korean pop singer
 Patti Kim (writer), Korean American writer

See also
Patty Kim, Canadian filmmaker
Patty Kim (politician), American politician